The Nihon Ki-in, also known as the Japan Go Association, is the main organizational body for Go in Japan, overseeing Japan's professional system and issuing diplomas for amateur dan rankings. It is based in Tokyo. The other major Go association in Japan is Kansai Ki-in. 
Its innovations include the Oteai system of promotion, time limits in professional games, and the introduction of issuing diplomas to strong amateur players, to affirm their ranks.

History
The Nihon Ki-in was established in July 1924. The first president of the Nihon Ki-in was Makino Nobuaki, a great Go patron himself, with Okura Kishichiro serving as vice president. The vast majority of pros at the time joined the fledgling organization, excepting the Inoue faction in Osaka and Nozawa Chikucho. A brief splinter group called Kiseisha was created soon after the Nihon Ki-in was formed, but most of the players involved had returned to the Nihon Ki-in within a couple of years. Then in 1950, its western branch split away to form the Kansai Ki-in.

Tournaments
The Nihon Ki-in organizes many tournaments for professional players. The major title tournaments include the Kisei, Meijin, Honinbo, Judan, Tengen, Gosei, and the Oza. There are also separate Honinbo, Meijin, and Kisei titles for women.

Major title winners by year
(*): Kansai Ki-in player

Organization 
 Tokyo Headquarters (Ichigaya): 7-2 Goban-cho, Chiyoda-ku, Tokyo
 Tokyo Yurakucho Igo Center: 9F Tokyo Kotsu-Kaikan, 2-10-1 Yuraku-cho, Chiyoda-ku, Tokyo
 Osaka Headquarters: 10F Applause Tower, 19-19 Sayamachi, Osaka
 Osaka Umeda Igo Salon: 6F Hankyu Five Annex Building, 1-23 Sumidacho, Kita-ku, Osaka
 Chubu Headquarters:  1-19  Syumoku-cho, Higashi-ku, Nagoya
 The Nihon Ki-in European Go Cultural Centre: Schokland14,1181 HV Amstelveen, Netherlands
 Nihon Ki-in Do Brasil:  R. Dr Fabricio Vampre No116, Ana Rosa - São Paulo - Brazil
 Nihon Ki-in Go Institute of The West U.S.A.: 700 N.E., 45th Street, Seattle WA

See also 

 International Go Federation
 List of professional Go tournaments
 All Japan Student Go Federation
 Hanguk Kiwon (Korean Go Association)
 Zhongguo Qiyuan (governing body for mind game organizations, including Chinese Go Association)
 Taiwan Chi-Yuan (Taiwanese Go Association)
 Hoensha
 American Go Association
 British Go Association
 Irish Go Association
 European Go Federation
 Singapore Weiqi Association
 Hong Kong Go Association
 New Zealand Go Society

References

External links

 Nihon Ki-in English Website

Go organizations
Sports governing bodies in Japan